Gaeumannomyces is a genus of fungi in the family Magnaporthaceae.

Species
Gaeumannomyces amomi
Gaeumannomyces caricis
Gaeumannomyces cylindrosporus
Gaeumannomyces graminis
Gaeumannomyces graminis var. avenae
Gaeumannomyces graminis var. graminis
Gaeumannomyces graminis var. maydis
Gaeumannomyces graminis var. tritici
Gaeumannomyces incrustans
Gaeumannomyces licualae
Gaeumannomyces medullaris
Gaeumannomyces mirabilis
Gaeumannomyces wongoonoo

External links

Sordariomycetes genera
Magnaporthales